James Andrew Leonhard (born October 27, 1982) is an American football coach and former player. He was most recently the interim head coach for the Wisconsin Badgers football team. Leonhard played college football at Wisconsin and professionally as safety for ten seasons in the National Football League (NFL). Leonhard was signed by the Buffalo Bills as an undrafted free agent in 2005 after playing college football at the University of Wisconsin. He also played for the Baltimore Ravens, New York Jets, Denver Broncos, New Orleans Saints, and Cleveland Browns.

High school
Leonhard played high school football at Flambeau High School in Tony, Wisconsin, where he was the starting quarterback and strong safety. During his freshman year, 1997, the Flambeau Falcons won the Wisconsin state championship in football in division six over River Ridge high school. He was a team captain in his junior and senior seasons, the same seasons in which he was a first-team All-State performer. He was also named team MVP in his senior year.

College career
Leonhard was a walk-on football player at the University of Wisconsin–Madison, having received no Division I-A scholarship offers out of high school. He was not awarded a scholarship until his senior year, despite the fact that he had been a regular starting safety before that season and had already been named All-Big Ten twice. Noted for his speed, leaping ability, and sure tackling, he totaled 21 interceptions (tied with Jamar Fletcher for the most in school history) and made 281 tackles. He held the Big Ten Conference career punt return yardage record with 1,347 yards until Michigan's Steve Breaston eclipsed his mark in 2006.

Professional career

Buffalo Bills
Leonhard was the only undrafted rookie on the 53-man opening day roster for the 2005 Bills. He played in 10 games, finishing with 1 kick return for 36 yards.

He was released during the 2006 preseason; however, he was signed 11 days later following an injury to fellow Wisconsin alumnus Troy Vincent. He finished the 2006 season with 13 tackles and 1 fumble recovery while making his first career start on December 10.

In 2007, Leonhard stepped in for injured starter Ko Simpson and recorded 13 tackles on opening day against the Denver Broncos. He went on to record 54 tackles, 2 interceptions, 3 passes defended, and 1 fumble recovery, despite being hampered by a calf injury halfway through the season.

Baltimore Ravens
In 2008, Leonhard signed with the Baltimore Ravens, where he started in 13 of 16 regular season games, replacing the injured Dawan Landry. He set career-high marks with 68 tackles and one sack to go along with one interception, which he returned for a TD against the Cincinnati Bengals.

New York Jets

In 2009, Leonhard signed with the New York Jets, reuniting him with former Ravens defensive coordinator and later New York Jets head coach, Rex Ryan. Terms were $6 million for 3 years with $1 million guaranteed. 
 During the 2009 year, Leonhard started all 16 games making 66 tackles, 2.5 sacks, 1 interception, 6 passes defended, and 1 forced fumble. His efforts led to the Jets going to the play-offs but eventually losing to the Indianapolis Colts in the AFC Championship game.

On December 3, 2010, Leonhard suffered a fractured tibia after a collision with wide receiver Patrick Turner during practice. He underwent surgery the same night and was ruled out for the rest of the 2010 season. Leonhard played 11 games in 2010 making 56 tackles, 1 interception, 4 passes defended, 1 forced fumble, and 1 fumble recovery. The Jets would go to the play-offs again but lose the AFC Championship to the Pittsburgh Steelers.

During a game against the Kansas City Chiefs on December 11, 2011, Leonhard landed awkwardly after catching an interception thrown by Tyler Palko. Leonhard was carried off the field by a medical cart. A few days later, an MRI revealed that there was a torn patellar tendon in his right knee. As a result, Leonhard was eliminated for the rest of the 2011 season. Leonhard played 13 games in 2011 making 48 tackles, 1 interception, 6 passes defended, 1 forced fumble, and 1 fumble recovery.

Denver Broncos
In August 2012, Leonhard agreed to a one-year deal with the Denver Broncos. During the 2012 season with the Broncos, Leonhard made 17 tackles, 2 interceptions, 3 passes defended, and 1 fumble recovery in 16 games (1 start).

New Orleans Saints
In April 2013, Leonhard signed a one-year deal with the New Orleans Saints. He was released before the season.

Second stint with the Buffalo Bills
Leonhard signed a contract with the Buffalo Bills in September 2013, returning to the club where he started his professional career. During his first season back with Buffalo in 2013, Leonhard made 41 tackles, 4 interceptions, and 5 passes defended in 16 games (6 starts).

Cleveland Browns
In 2014, Leonhard joined the Cleveland Browns. He made 27 tackles, 1 sack, 2 interceptions and 3 passes defensed. He retired following the season.

NFL statistics

Coaching

In February 2016, Leonhard joined Paul Chryst's staff at his alma mater as defensive backs coach. In his year off between retiring from the NFL and being named DB coach for the Badgers, Leonhard spent his time studying college film with then-Wisconsin Defensive Coordinator Dave Aranda and familiarizing himself with schemes that exist in college football that aren't prevalent in the NFL, such as the zone-read option offense. Prior to UW DB coach Daronte Jones leaving UW for an assistant coaching position with the Dolphins, Leonhard had been asking Paul Chryst about joining the Badgers staff.

In February 2017, Leonhard was named the new defensive coordinator of the Badgers, replacing Justin Wilcox, who became the new head coach of California. In late November 2017, Leonhard was named one of five finalists for the Broyles Award which recognized the top assistant coach in college football.

On October 2, 2022, Leonhard was named interim head coach of the Badgers following the firing of Paul Chryst.

After Wisconsin hired Luke Fickell as head coach in November 2022, Leonhard announced that he would be leaving Wisconsin at the end of the 2022 football season.

Head coaching record

College

References

External links
 
 Wisconsin profile
 Buffalo Bills profile
 New York Jets profile

1982 births
Living people
American football safeties
Baltimore Ravens players
Buffalo Bills players
Cleveland Browns players
Denver Broncos players
New Orleans Saints players
New York Jets players
Wisconsin Badgers football coaches
Wisconsin Badgers football players
People from Ladysmith, Wisconsin
Coaches of American football from Wisconsin
Players of American football from Wisconsin